Peking University Gymnasium, nicknamed China's Spine, is an indoor arena located in the southeastern part of Peking University in Beijing, China. The gymnasium was constructed for the table tennis events of the 2008 Summer Olympics and the Paralympics.

The gymnasium has a floor space of 26,900 m², 6,000 permanent seats and 2,000 temporary seats. It was completed in August 2007. In November 2011, Khoo Teck Puat donated about 173 million RMB to Peking University for the construction and the gymnasium was entitled 'Khoo Teck Puat Gymnasium'.

After the Olympics, the gymnasium was renovated between September 2010 to October 2011. The gymnasium has become a sport complex which includes fitness club, swimming pool and courts and facilities for a variety of sports including badminton, table tennis,  squash and billiards. The gymnasium has also hosted a number of events including the Best Ten Singer Competitions of Peking University (十佳歌手) and Graduation Commercements.

References
 Official website

Venues of the 2008 Summer Olympics
Olympic table tennis venues
Indoor arenas in China
Sports venues in Beijing
Peking University buildings
University sports venues in China